"Mawtini" was the national anthem of Iraq from 1958 to 1965, and then again from 2003 to 2004. It is solely an instrumental composition and thus has no lyrics.

History
"Mawtini" was composed by Lewis Zanbaka and was originally adopted as Iraq's national anthem in 1958. It is a short instrumental composition, having no lyrics. "Mawtini" was used as the national anthem of Iraq until 1965; it was readopted in 2003 for a short time after the fall of Saddam Hussein's Ba'athist regime. In late 2004, "Mawtini" was replaced in its capacity as the Iraqi national anthem with a new national anthem, coincidentally also called "Mawtini", of no relation.

References

1950s instrumentals
Historical national anthems
Iraqi music